A list of films produced by the Israeli film industry released in 2016.

References

External links
 Israeli films of 2016 at the Internet Movie Database

Lists of 2016 films by country or language
Film
2016